Vello Pärnpuu (born 12 February 1973) is an Estonian wrestler.

Career 
He was born in Koonga, Pärnu County. In 1999 he graduated from Estonian Agricultural University.

He began his sporting career in Koonga basic school, coached by Harri Timberg. He has participated in World Wrestling Championships. He is multiple-times Estonian champion.

References

Living people
1973 births
Estonian male sport wrestlers
Estonian University of Life Sciences alumni
People from Lääneranna Parish